The Glover Rocks are a group of rocks lying northwest of Avian Island, off the south end of Adelaide Island, Antarctica. They were named by the UK Antarctic Place-Names Committee for John F. Glover, 3rd Engineer of RRS John Biscoe (1962–63), the ship assisting the Royal Navy Hydrographic Survey Unit which charted the feature in 1963.

References

Rock formations of Adelaide Island